Kavalai Padathe Sagodhara is a 1998 Indian Tamil language comedy drama film, written and directed by Keyaar. The film stars Pandiarajan and Suvaluxmi, while K. R. Vijaya and Janagaraj portrayed supporting roles. The music for the film was composed by Ilaiyaraaja and the film opened to positive reviews in April 1998. The film was remake of Malayalam film Kalyanji Anandji.

Cast

Pandiarajan
Suvaluxmi as Philomena (Meena)
K. R. Vijaya
Janagaraj
S. S. Chandran as Vasool Baaba
Raghuram
Prakash Raj
Radharavi
Vadivukkarasi
Manivannan
Loose Mohan
Idichapuli Selvaraj

Soundtrack
Music was composed by Ilaiyaraaja and lyrics were written by Vaali, Panchu Arunachalam and Arivumathi.

Release
The film opened to positive reviews in April 1998 with a critic from Indolink.com adding it is a "good film to watch while chatting with friends" and that the "film belongs to Suvaluxmi, as her nice homely face suits well to the role". Another critic noted "director KR has done a good job of bringing all religions together so as to show how the country is secular even in modern era" and that "his characterization is authentic and it is the comical moments which escalate the flick".

References

External links

1998 films
1990s Tamil-language films
Films scored by Ilaiyaraaja
Indian comedy-drama films
Films directed by Keyaar
1998 comedy-drama films
Tamil remakes of Malayalam films